William John Young (20 October 1850 – 1 June 1931) was an Australian company chief executive and station manager. Young was born in Belfast, Antrim, Ireland and died in Darling Point, Sydney, New South Wales.

References

Australian farmers
Australian Presbyterians
Australian people of Irish descent
1850 births
1931 deaths